The discography of Australian rock group The Saints consists of thirteen studio albums, seventeen singles, six EPs, two live albums and ten compilation albums. The Saints began in 1974 as punk rockers and released their first single, "(I'm) Stranded", in September 1976 on their own Fatal Records label. They were signed to EMI and released their debut album in February 1977, (I'm) Stranded. Mainstay founder Chris Bailey is the principal songwriter and record producer. Their sound became more R&B and pop rock. Their highest charting album, All Fools Day peaked in the Top 30 on the Australian Kent Music Report Albums Chart in April 1986. Their cover version of The Easybeats' hit "The Music Goes Round My Head", issued in November 1988, peaked in the Top 40 on the ARIA Singles Chart.

In May 2001, Australasian Performing Right Association (APRA) celebrated its 75th anniversary and named "(I'm) Stranded" in its Top 30 Australian songs of all time. The band was inducted into the Australian Recording Industry Association (ARIA) Hall of Fame in September. In 2007, "I'm Stranded" was one of the first 20 songs stored on the National Film and Sound Archive's Sounds of Australia registry. Their debut album, (I'm) Stranded, was listed at No. 20 in the book 100 Best Australian Albums in October 2010. Their third album, Prehistoric Sounds, also appeared in the list, at No. 41.

Studio albums

Live albums

Compilation albums

Extended plays

Singles

References

General
  Note: Archived [on-line] copy has limited functionality.
 
Specific

External links
 

Rock music group discographies
Discographies of Australian artists